People from the United States of America are known as and refer to themselves as Americans. Different languages use different terms for citizens of the United States. All forms of English refer to US citizens as Americans, a term deriving from the United States of America, the country's official name. In the English context, it came to refer to inhabitants of British America, and then the United States. However, there is some linguistic ambiguity over this use due to the other senses of the word American, which can also refer to people from the Americas in general. Other languages, including Japanese, and Russian, use cognates of American to refer to people from the United States, while others, like French, or particularly Spanish and Portuguese, primarily use terms derived from United States. There are various other local and colloquial names for Americans. The name America came from the Italian navigator Amerigo Vespucci.

Development of the term American 

Amerigo Vespucci first demonstrated that Brazil and the West Indies did not represent Asia's eastern outskirts as conjectured by Christopher Columbus, but instead constituted an entirely separate landmass hitherto unknown to the peoples of the Old World. Martin Waldseemüller coined the term America (in honor of Vespucci) in a 1507 world map.

First uses of the adjective American referenced European settlements in the New World. Americans referred to the indigenous peoples of the Americas and subsequently to European settlers and their descendants. English use of the term American for people of European descent dates to the 17th century, with the earliest recorded appearance being in Thomas Gage's The English-American: A New Survey of the West Indies in 1648. In English, American came to be applied especially to people in British America and thus its use as a demonym for the United States derives by extension.

The United States Declaration of Independence of 1776 refers to "the thirteen  States of America", making the first formal use of the country name, which was officially adopted in 1777 by the nation's first governing constitution, the Articles of Confederation. The Federalist Papers of 1787–1788, written by Alexander Hamilton, John Jay, and James Madison to advocate the ratification of the United States Constitution, use the word American in both its original pan-American sense, but also in its United States sense: Federalist Paper 24 refers to the "American possessions" of Britain and Spain (i.e. land outside of the United States) while Federalist Papers 51 and 70 refer to the United States as "the American republic". People from the United States increasingly referred to themselves as Americans through the end of the 18th century and the 1795 Treaty of Peace and Amity with the Barbary States refers to "American Citizens" while George Washington spoke to his people of "[t]he name of American, which belongs to you in your national capacity" in his 1796 farewell address. Eventually, this usage spread through other English-speaking countries and the unqualified noun American in all forms of the English language now chiefly refers to natives or citizens of the United States, though other senses are generally specified with a qualifier such as Latin American or North American.

International use 
International speakers of English generally refer to people from the United States as Americans while equivalent translations of American are used in many other languages, namely Italian, Dutch, Afrikaans, Japanese (rōmaji: amerika-jin), Filipino, Hebrew, Arabic, Portuguese, Russian and Hindi (अमरीकी transliteration:  Amreeki).

In French,    is used in an official and colloquial way.

In German, the designation  and its adjective form  are sometimes used, though  is more common in scientific, official, journalistic, and colloquial parlance. The respective guidelines of the foreign ministries of Austria, Germany, and Switzerland all dictate  for official usage. Ami is common in colloquial speech. 

The United States itself is called , similar to Usonia. L. L. Zamenhof, the inventor of Esperanto, used the  terms as early as 1910.

Chinese has distinct words for American in the continental sense and American in the national sense. The United States of America is called  (Pinyin: měiguó; Jyutping: mei5 gwok3) while the continents of the Americas are called  (Pinyin: měizhōu; Jyutping: mei5 zau1).

Alternative terms 
The only officially and commonly used alternative for referring to the people of the United States in English is to refer to them as citizens of that country. Another alternative is US-American, also spelled US American.

Several single-word English alternatives for American have been suggested over time, especially Usonian, popularized by architect Frank Lloyd Wright, and the nonce term United-Statesian.

Writer H. L. Mencken collected a number of proposals from between 1789 and 1939, finding terms including Columbian, Columbard, Fredonian, Frede, Unisian, United Statesian, Colonican, Appalacian, Usian, Washingtonian, Usonian, Uessian, U-S-ian, Uesican, and United Stater. Names for broader categories include terms such as Western Hemispherian, New Worlder, and North Atlantican.

Nevertheless, no alternative to "American" is common in English.

Yankee 

Yankee (or Yank) is a colloquial term for Americans in English; cognates can be found in other languages. Within the United States, Yankee usually refers to people specifically from New England or the Northern United States, though it has been applied to Americans in general since the 18th century, especially by the British. The earliest recorded use in this context is in a 1784 letter by Horatio Nelson.

The cockney rhyming slang and Australian derogatory slang term septic (and in the Australian case, seppo) derive from rhyming "yank" with "septic tank".

See also 

 List of demonyms for US states and territories

References

Notes

Bibliography 
 
 

American culture
Ethnonyms
Political terminology